The Middle River is a distributary river in Baldwin County, Alabama, which forms part of the Mobile-Tensaw River Delta.

See also
List of Alabama rivers

References

Rivers of Baldwin County, Alabama
Rivers of Alabama
Tributaries of Mobile Bay